Josephine Santiago-Bond is the Chief of the Advanced Engineering Development Branch at National Aeronautics and Space Administration (NASA). Santiago-Bond is also one of the branch's creators.

Personal life 
Santiago-Bond was born in the U.S. to Filipino parents. Her parents were studying in U.S. and returned to the Philippines where Santiago-Bond grew up. She has two sisters.

Education 
Santiago-Bond attended the Philippine Science High School. Santiago-Bond went on to attend college at the University of the Philippines and received a Bachelors of Science in Electronics and Communications. She earned her master's degree in electrical engineering at South Dakota State University.

Career 
After graduated from University of the Philippines, Santiago-Bond worked for Daktronics, Inc. while she was pursuing a master’s degree at South Dakota State University. She also worked as a research assistant with an advisor who received funding from NASA’s Space Grant Consortium. She was a graduate intern at Kennedy Space Center (KSC) during her master's degree until she graduated in 2005. She then started working at NASA full time as an electrical engineer.  She had also contributed to the formulation and launch of the Ares I-X in 2009. She was a part of NASA's 2012 Systems Engineering Leadership Development Program (SELDP), where she worked at the Ames Research Center on the LADEE lunar missions.  She worked on the 2017 Regolith and Environment Science and Oxygen and Lunar Volatiles Extraction (RESOLVE) project at KSC, which aimed to map water ice and other compounds on the moon.

Santiago-Bond became the Chief of the newly formed Advanced Engineering Development Branch that she helped create and that had worked on 70 different projects as of 2019 As head of the branch, she is in charge of more than 20 engineers and a handful of interns.

References 

Filipino women
NASA people
American engineers
South Dakota State University alumni
University of the Philippines alumni
Year of birth missing (living people)
Living people